Lwak Girls High School is a girls' high school in Kenya. The school was built in the 1960s (with around 300 girls), and has grown drastically over the years. It is located in Rarieda  District, Nyanza province in western Kenya.

Computer Studies was introduced as an examinable subject in the year 2002 by Mr. Lawi Osoo. In 2007, with support from Teach A Man To Fish, an apiary was installed to aid the teaching of bee-keeping, thus extending the school's agricultural science department. The school operates a nursery where mango trees are grown, with the aim of reducing the occurrence of Vitamin A deficiency.

Administration
B.O.G. Chairman is Michael Kombugoh; the school's Principal is Miriam Jagogo.

Notable alumnae

 Lucy Gichuhi, politician
 Dorcas Oduor, office of the Director of Public Prosecutions Kenya
 Eva Wangui Muchemi, founder and Executive Director of Diabetis Management Information Centre  (DMI)

References

High schools and secondary schools in Kenya
Girls' schools in Kenya
Education in Nyanza Province
Educational institutions established in the 1960s
1960s establishments in Kenya